Protolira valvatoides is a species of sea snail, a marine gastropod mollusk in the family Skeneidae.

Description
The shell grows to a length of 3.5 mm.

Distribution
This species is found along the Mid-Atlantic Ridge.

References

 Warén A. & Bouchet P., 1993: New, records, species, genera, and a new family of gastropods from hydrothermal vents and hydrocarbon seeps; Zoologica Scripta 22: 1–90

External links
 Kiehl, Shell structures of selected gastropods from hydrothermal vents and seeps; Malacologia v. 46, 2004

valvatoides
Gastropods described in 1993